The 3rd Corps was a Yugoslav Partisan corps that fought against the Germans, Independent State of Croatia (NDH) and Chetniks in occupied Democratic Federal Yugoslavia during World War II. It was created in November 1942 as the 1st Bosnian Corps, and underwent a name change in 1943. It grew in size until 1 January 1945 when it was subordinated to the Partisan 2nd Army. The 3rd Corps spent most of 1944 engaged in hard fighting against the 13th Waffen Mountain Division of the SS Handschar (1st Croatian) in eastern Bosnia.

Notes

References
 
 

Corps of the Yugoslav Partisans
Military units and formations established in 1942